The 2019 New Zealand Darts Masters, presented by Burger King & TAB was the inaugural staging of the tournament by the Professional Darts Corporation, and was the fifth entry in the 2019 World Series of Darts. The tournament featured 16 players (eight PDC players facing eight regional qualifiers) and was held at the Claudelands Arena in Hamilton, New Zealand from 23–24 August 2019.

Michael van Gerwen won his 14th World Series title with an 8–1 win over Raymond van Barneveld in the final.

Prize money
The total prize fund was £60,000.

Qualifiers
The eight invited PDC representatives, (seeded according to the World Series Order of Merit) are:

  Peter Wright (quarter-finals)
  Michael van Gerwen (champion)
  Rob Cross (semi-finals)
  Daryl Gurney (quarter-finals)
  Gary Anderson (quarter-finals)
  Simon Whitlock (first round)
  James Wade (semi-finals)
  Raymond van Barneveld (runner-up)

Regional qualifier Corey Cadby withdrew from the tournament on 19 August, citing personal reasons. He was replaced by Warren Parry, the highest ranked New Zealand darts player not already qualified.

The regional qualifiers are:

Draw

References

NZ Darts Masters
World Series of Darts
NZ Darts Masters